Portugal joined International Monetary Fund (IMF) on March 29, 1961. They joined by submitting 100 percent of their quota, which is 2,060.10 SDR. Currently, Portugal is using 187.5 percent of their quota, which is 3,862.69 SDR. Portugal has not had an IMF disbursement since 2014. Portugal has just .44 percent of voting power in the IMF.

Constituency 
Portugal is part of a constituency with Albania, Greece, Italy, Malta, and San Marino. Their representative on the Executive Board of the IMF is Domenico G. Fanizza of Italy. Portugal has 22,066 votes, which makes them have the third most votes in their constituency, preceded by Greece, then Italy. This constituency has 4.13 percent of the total voting power within the IMF.

Surveillance 
As Portugal is a member of the IMF, they receive surveillance reports from the IMF which details any red flags in their economy, as well as give suggestions for the future health of their economy. Before the 2007 financial crisis, they IMF conducted several surveillance reports on Portugal that if heeded, could have lessened the effect of the crisis. Some of the issues that were highlighted were the increase in small scale economic asymmetries, lessening growth, lack of monetary consolidation, a lack of competition, ignorance of their capital flow issues, and issues with private sector borrowing.

Financial crisis 
In 2007, when the world was swept with financial crisis, Portugal's economy suffered in several areas. Portugal was plagued with low real GDP growth and borrowing costs, significant deficits, low investment, and high national debt. Additionally, the quick stop of capital flows in Portugal was made easier because of this increasing amount of debt that was being accrued. By 2009, it seemed like Portugal would start to recover, but the Euro Crisis quickly took the Portuguese economy back down with it.

Agreement 
By 2011, the crisis was so bad, Portugal requested a three year long bailout with the IMF. The same year, Portugal received a disbursement of 11,503,000 SDR as their first of this deal. The agreement that Portugal and the IMF made focused on both monetary contraction and reforms on economic structure. The IMF reforms for Portugal included changes to labor and product markets, taxes, pensions and the public and the financial sector.

Conditions 
There were several conditions placed on Portugal in exchange for this bailout. These conditions included structural benchmarks and prior actions predominately in Portugal's fiscal sector.

Results 

There were mixed results of this IMF program. On one hand, Portugal recovered their access to Capital markets, which was a main goal of the program and the largest contributor to their crisis. On the other hand, the Portuguese government still has significant debt and unstable foreign liabilities.

Current Economic Status 
As a member of the IMF, Portugal also receives Article IV reports from the IMF. In the latest report, that was published in September 2018 the IMF details a report on the current Portuguese economy. This report details that although investments and exports have spurred growth and low inflation throughout 2017, there is persisting unemployment in Portugal. Structural balance is also said to be improving as deficits and debt are steadily decreasing. Banks are improving as well, though credit is growing much slower and is holding back further improvement. Overall, the economy is steady, but Portugal is still susceptible to downturns and needs more tenable growth.

References 

Economy of Portugal
International Monetary Fund relations